A skyphos (plural skyphoi) is a two-handled deep wine-cup on a low flanged base or none. The handles may be horizontal ear-shaped thumbholds that project from the rim (in both Corinthian and Athenian shapes), or they may be loop handles at the rim or that  stand away from the lower part of the body. Skyphoi of the type called  glaux (owl) have one horizontal and one vertical thumbhold handle.

Examples

Early skyphoi were made during the Geometric period. Corinth set the conventions that Athens followed. Over a long period the shape remained the same while the style of decoration changed.

Skyphoi were also made of precious metals, generally silver and gold leaf, many examples exist. One possible, well-preserved example is the Warren cup, an ovoid scyphus made of silver, as described by John Pollini. A Roman skyphos of cameo glass can be seen at the Getty Museum.

Comparable forms of a handled drinking cup on a base included:
Cotyla, a more generic term for any cup.
Kantharos
Komast cup
Kylix

Modern uses
The word skyphos has been adopted for the purposes of biological classification with regard to jellyfish, which are included in the class Scyphozoa (literally cup-shaped animal), and Sarcoscypha, the scarlet cup fungus.

See also
 Black-figure pottery
 Red-figure pottery
 Boscoreale Treasure
 Geometric art

Notes

References

External links
Skyphoi 
Perseus Encyclopedia: skyphos

Ancient Greek pot shapes
Wine accessories